Snake bean may refer to two different species of leguminous plants:

 Bobgunnia madagascariensis, a poisonous species found in Africa
 Vigna unguiculata subsp. sesquipedalis, a widely cultivated edible legume